The Beatrice Offshore Wind Farm now known as Beatrice Offshore Windfarm Ltd (BOWL) project, is a wind farm close to the Beatrice oil field in the Moray Firth, part of the North Sea 13 km off the north east coast of Scotland.

History

Evaluation project
Beatrice Wind Farm Demonstrator Project was a joint venture between Scottish and Southern Energy and Talisman Energy (UK) to build and operate an evaluation wind farm in the deep water close to the Beatrice Oil field that Talisman Energy was planning to decommission.

Built in 2007, with two turbines and a total capacity of 10 MW, it was designed to examine the feasibility of building a commercial wind farm in deep water. The jacket foundation design was developed by the Norwegian company OWEC Tower AS, and fabricated in Scotland by Burntisland Fabrications. The site is 13 km from the Scottish coast and in 45 m of water. The evaluation project was proposed to last five years. All the electricity generated was fed to the nearby Beatrice Alpha oil platform.

The oilfield ceased operations in March 2015, and the demonstrator wind farm is expected to be decommissioned between 2024 and 2027.

Planned expansion
In February 2009, the partnership of SSE Renewables and Repsol Nuevas Energias UK, was awarded exclusivity by The Crown Estate to develop the Beatrice offshore wind farm in the Outer Moray Firth just to the north of the existing demonstrator turbines. In April 2014, the UK Energy Secretary Ed Davey announced that the Beatrice Wind Farm would be one of eight projects awarded a contract for difference to set the price paid for its power for the next 15 years.

On 23 May 2016 approval was given for a £2.6bn expansion of the wind farm to 84 turbines with a capacity of 588MW of electricity, enough to supply 450,000 homes.

In June 2016 contracts were awarded to the Global Energy Group, in association with Siemens Wind Power, for fabrication and assembly of the turbines at Nigg Energy Park in Ross Shire, and to Wick Harbour for the assembly and transport process.  Several other Highland towns are expected to benefit during the construction phase due to the expected influx of workers. Work began in April 2017.

Construction and grid connection
Offshore construction began in April 2017. As of 15 May 2018, 56 of the total 84 turbine and 2 OTM jackets had been installed, first power from the main phase was generated in July 2018, with full commissioning expected to follow in spring 2019.

In January 2019, the wind farm was connected to the new Caithness - Moray Link. The high voltage direct current link enables power generated at Beatrice and other projects to be sent to high population areas in southern Scotland.

The link which runs from Caithness to Moray, which comes ashore at Portgordon in Moray, is connected to the new Beatrice/BOWL thence to Blackhillock Substation near Keith in Moray, the UK's biggest electricity substation as of January 2019.

Installation and commissioning for all 84 turbines was completed on 15 May 2019.

Controversy
In October 2018 details emerged that migrant workers were being used increasingly in the construction phase.

It came out that 11 Russian Workers were arrested at Aberdeen Airport in 2017 as they were working illegally on Seafarers documents.

In an unexpected move, the UK Home Office granted a 6-month waiver so that the crew could continue to work. This has been extended twice until 2019.

See also

Wind power in Scotland
Wind power in the United Kingdom
List of offshore wind farms in the United Kingdom
Beatrice Oil Field
Renewable energy in Scotland

References

External links
LORC Knowledge - Datasheet for Beatrice Wind Farm

Wind farms in Scotland
Offshore wind farms in the North Sea
2007 establishments in Scotland